Stip or STIP may refer to:

Places 

Štip Municipality, Macedonian municipality
Štip, the largest town in the eastern part of the Republic of Macedonia

Law 
Stipendiary magistrate, magistrates in receipt of a stipend
Stipulation, an agreement, in American law

Other uses 
Kees Stip (1913–2001)
Short-Term Income Protection
SINQ Target Irradiation Program 
Stip (dish),  a regional dish in the Dutch provinces of Groningen, Drenthe and Overijssel
Studenten Techniek In Politiek, local political party
 Stip (geometry)
 Short term incentive plan, see Executive compensation
 Stand-in processing